Richard Berg (February 16, 1922 – September 1, 2009) was an American screenwriter as well as a film and television producer. Among his credits is the 1985 miniseries Space and Wallenberg: A Hero's Story.

Biography 
Berg was born in New York City and raised in New Rochelle, New York. After graduating from Lehigh University in 1942, Berg went west to Hollywood to pursue a career in acting or producing and found work as a dialogue coach for Roy Rogers and other cowboy actors at Republic Pictures. Berg died on September 1, 2009, after falling at his home in Los Angeles. He was 87.

References

External links
 

American male screenwriters
Film producers from New York (state)
Television producers from New York City
Lehigh University alumni
Writers from New York City
Writers from New Rochelle, New York
People from Greater Los Angeles
1922 births
2009 deaths
Accidental deaths from falls
Accidental deaths in California
Businesspeople from New Rochelle, New York
Screenwriters from New York (state)
20th-century American male writers
20th-century American screenwriters
20th-century American businesspeople